Near Brașov, Romania, on Șprenghi Hill, it is supposed that a fort existed.

See also
List of castra

External links
Roman castra from Romania - Google Maps / Earth

Notes

References

Roman legionary fortresses in Romania
Ancient history of Transylvania